Francisco de Solís Quiñones y Montenegro (died 1545) was a Roman Catholic prelate who served as Bishop of Bagnoregio (1528–1545).

Biography
Francisco de Solís Quiñones y Montenegro was born in Spain ordained a priest in the Military Order of Saint James of the Sword.
On 24 January 1528, he was appointed during the papacy of Pope Clement VII as Bishop of Bagnoregio. 
He served as Bishop of Bagnoregio until his death in 1545.

References

External links and additional sources
 (for Chronology of Bishops) 
 (for Chronology of Bishops) 

16th-century Italian Roman Catholic bishops
1545 deaths
Bishops appointed by Pope Clement VII
People from Salamanca
University of Salamanca alumni
Academic staff of the University of Salamanca